K. Murali Mohana Rao is an Indian film director, and producer known for his works in Telugu, and Hindi language films. Rao made his feature film debut with the 1983 super-hit Telugu language action film Sangharshana, starring Chiranjeevi and Vijayashanti. In 1984 he scripted and directed the drama film Kathanayakudu, upon its success, he remade it in Hindi as Dilwaala (1986). 

He is known for works such as the western action film Kodama Simham (1990) which was simultaneously dubbed into English as Hunters Of The Indian Treasure and Hindi as Main Hoon Khiladiyon Ka Khiladi. The film received positive reviews and turned out to be a hit.

1991 musical hit film Prem Qaidi was a remake of the 1990 Telugu film Prema Khaidi and marked the feature film debut of actress Karishma Kapoor, 1993 romantic drama film Anari a bollywood remake of the 1991 Tamil film Chinna Thambi was also successful.

The fantasy action comedy filmTaqdeerwala (1995) was a remake of the 1994 Telugu film Yamaleela. In 2002 he directed Kya Yehi Pyaar Hai, a remake of the 1997 Tamil film Love Today which was a hit at the box office.

Selected filmography
Daddy Cool: Join the Fun (2009)
Kya Yehi Pyaar Hai (2002)
To Fall in Love (2000)
Bandhan (1998)
Vijeta (1996)
Taqdeerwala (1995)
Super Police (1994)
Anari (1993)
Prem Qaidi (1991)
Kodama Simham (1990)
Dost (1989)
Rakhwala (1989)
Bharya Bartulu (1988)
Ramudu Bheemudu (1988)
Trimurtulu (1987)
Brahma Rudrulu (1986)
Dilwaala (1986)
Kathanayakudu (1984)
Sangharshana (1983)

References

External links
 

Living people
Telugu film directors
21st-century Indian film directors
Hindi-language film directors
Telugu film producers
Hindi film producers
Film people from Andhra Pradesh
20th-century Indian film directors
Film producers from Andhra Pradesh
Film directors from Andhra Pradesh
Screenwriters from Andhra Pradesh
Year of birth missing (living people)